Malinci is an uninhabited settlement in Karlovac County, Croatia. 

Ghost towns in Croatia